Lynyrd Skynyrd is an American rock band originally formed in 1966, later named after the guitarist Gary Rossington's high school gym teacher Leonard Skinner.  The band has released many studio, live, and other albums, along with several singles and video discs.

The band has sold 28 million albums in the US since 1991 when Nielsen SoundScan started tracking sales, not including album sales for the band's first 17 years.

Albums

Studio albums

Live albums

Compilation albums

Singles

Videography

References

External Links
 

Discographies of American artists
Rock music group discographies
Discography